Christiane Huth (born 12 September 1980, Suhl, East Germany) is a German rower. She competed at the 2008 Summer Olympics, where she won a silver medal in double sculls.

References

1980 births
Living people
German female rowers
Olympic silver medalists for Germany
Olympic rowers of Germany
Rowers at the 2008 Summer Olympics
Olympic medalists in rowing
Medalists at the 2008 Summer Olympics
World Rowing Championships medalists for Germany
People from Suhl
Sportspeople from Thuringia
21st-century German women